Alcaig (Old Norse which means Auk Bay: Alcaig) is a village located close to Conon Bridge in Dingwall, Ross-shire in Highland,  and is within the Scottish council area of Highland.

References

Populated places in Ross and Cromarty